Anpara Thermal Power Station is located at Anpara in Sonbhadra district in the Indian state of Uttar Pradesh, about  from Varanasi on the Varanasi - Shakti Nagar route. It has a total power-generation capacity of 3850 MW using 9 units.

Operations 
There are in total nine operational units, all of which are coal-fired thermal power stations. The machinery for the UPRVUNL's Anpara A ( 3 units of 210MW each) are from Bharat Heavy Electricals Limited. UPRVUNL'S Anpara B (two units of 500 mW each) from Toshiba Corporation, Japan. Machinery for Anpara C were sourced by Lanco power from Dongfang Electric Company (China). Machinery for UPRVUNL'S Anpara D (2 units of 500 MW Each) is sourced from BHEL.

The coal to all these units is fed from Kharia, Kakri and Beena open coal mines of NCL by company owned freight trains, a merry go round system maintained by UPRVUNL and previously on roads by Dumpers.

Capacity 

In year 2007 Anpara C was allotted to be constructed in PPP sector domain. The new 2x600MW power plant made under PPP By Lanco Infratech. On 13 November 2019 there was a blast in Anpara D due to accidental leakage of hydrogen gas from the generator of 500 MW unit and made two  500 MW units out of operation. The blast was so intense and severe that the generator of one of the unit simply turned into pieces and four assistant engineers who were in control room suffered splinter and burn injuries.

References

External links

 uprvunl.org
 Uttar Pradesh and coal at SourceWatch (for a listing of Anapara power stations)

Coal-fired power stations in Uttar Pradesh
Buildings and structures in Sonbhadra district
2015 establishments in Uttar Pradesh
Energy infrastructure completed in 2015